"Roadrunner" is a song written by Jonathan Richman and recorded in various versions by Richman and his band, in most cases credited as the Modern Lovers. Richman has described it as an ode to Massachusetts Route 128.

Critic Greil Marcus described it as "the most obvious song in the world, and the strangest". Rolling Stone ranked it No. 269 on their list of the 500 Greatest Songs of All Time in 2004 and No. 77 in 2021.

Origins of the song
As a teenager Richman saw the Velvet Underground perform many times, and the format of "Roadrunner" is derived directly from the Velvets' song "Sister Ray".  "Roadrunner" mainly uses two chords (D and A, and only two brief uses of E) rather than "Sister Ray"'s three (which are G, F, and C), but they share the same persistent throbbing rhythm, and lyrics which in performance were largely improvised around a central theme.

However, in contrast to Lou Reed's morally detached saga of debauchery and decay, Richman's lyrics are passionate and candid, dealing with the freedom of driving alone and the beauty of the modern suburban environment, specifically the suburbs of Boston, Massachusetts.  The introductory countoff, "one - two - three - four - five - six!", and lyrics about "going faster miles an hour" with the "radio on" have endeared the song to many critics and listeners since it was first released.

Richman wrote the song by 1970, when he began performing it in public, aged 19.  Former bandmate John Felice recalled that as teenagers he and Richman "used to get in the car and just drive up and down Route 128 and the Turnpike.  We'd come up over a hill and he’d see the radio towers, the beacons flashing, and he would get almost teary-eyed. He'd see all this beauty in things where other people just wouldn’t see it."

Recordings by Jonathan Richman and the Modern Lovers
Richman's band the Modern Lovers first recorded "Roadrunner" with producer John Cale (previously of the Velvet Underground) in 1972.  This version was first released as a single and in 1976 on the Modern Lovers' long-delayed but highly acclaimed self-titled debut album (originally Home of the Hits HH019). The song is considered a rock and roll standard, a garage band classic and a proto-punk anthem.

Later in 1972, the group recorded two more versions with Kim Fowley, which were released in 1981 on the album, The Original Modern Lovers (Bomp BLP 4021).  A live version from 1973 was also later officially released on the album Live At Longbranch Saloon.

The most commercially successful version of the song, credited to Richman as a solo artist, was recorded for Beserkley Records in late 1974, produced by label boss Matthew King Kaufman, featured Jonathan backed by The Greg Kihn Band and released at the time on a single (Beserkley B-34701) with a B-side by the band Earth Quake.  Kaufman stated: "To record "Roadrunner" took the 3 minutes 35 seconds for the performance, about another 30 minutes to dump the background vocals on, and another 90 minutes to mix it". Kaufman was mistaken - this version is listed on the UK release of the single as being 4:40.

This version was reissued in 1975 on the album Beserkley Chartbusters Vol. 1 (Beserkley JBZ-0044). In the UK, where Richman had received substantial and very positive publicity in the music press, it was released in 1977 as a single (Beserkley BZZ 1), known as “Roadrunner (Once)” and credited to Jonathan Richman, with the Cale-produced “Roadrunner (Twice)” on the B-side, credited to the Modern Lovers, and lasting approximately 4:06.  This single reached number 11 in the UK singles chart in August 1977. Also in 1977, a live version titled “Roadrunner (Thrice)” lasting 8:24 was released as the B-side of the UK single "The Morning Of Our Lives" (Beserkley BZZ 7).

The differences among all these versions are in the lyrics, the duration, the instrumentation (electric garage rock vs. acoustic rock) and the way Richman sings them.

Cover versions
A version of "Roadrunner" was recorded by the Sex Pistols as a rough demo in 1976, seemingly in a spontaneous transition from Chuck Berry's "Johnny B. Goode", which is in the same key and a similar tempo. This recording was overdubbed in 1978 and released in 1979 on The Great Rock 'n' Roll Swindle album. Pistols' vocalist Johnny Rotten said that although he "hate(s) all music", "Roadrunner" is his favorite song. However in the recording, he forgets most of the lyrics.

Another punk cover was done by the British band Wire in their early days, before they diverged from punk into their more electronic, post-punk sound.  Their version of "Roadrunner" can be found on the album 1976 Demo, which is a collection of bootleg tracks that was released in 2010.

"Roadrunner" was also recorded by Joan Jett on her 1986 album Good Music, and again for her 1990 album of covers, The Hit List.

Phish opened their concert with "Roadrunner" in Mansfield, MA on September 11, 2000.

The Greg Kihn Band covered "Roadrunner" on their 1979 album With the Naked Eye and the song became a live staple for the group.

The Jazz Butcher released "Roadrunner" as a single in 1984, which got to number 50 in the British independent charts.

M.I.A. borrows lyrics from "Roadrunner" in the opening verses of her song "Bamboo Banga"

Steve Albini makes reference to the lyrics from "Roadrunner" in the first verse of Shellac's song "The End of Radio."

Session Americana recorded a version of "Roadrunner" on Northeast, their album of songs by songwriters based in the northeastern United States.

Sleaford Mods covered the song as "Chop Chop Chop" on The Originator (2009), which in turn was covered by Iggy Pop as "People, Places, Parties" in some live shows, such as the one for BBC Radio 6 Music at Maida Vale Studios on October 14, 2019.

Uses in popular culture
"Roadrunner" is featured on the Motion Picture Soundtrack to Mad Magazine'''s 1980 film Up the Academy, on the radio in the 1994 film PCU, in the 2003 film School of Rock, in the 2012 film Not Fade Away, in an episode in Season Two of the HBO series The Wire, and in Dennis Busenitz’ segment in Real Skateboards’ 2011 promotional video Since Day One. During a scene in the first episode of season two of the HBO series The Deuce, Maggie Gyllenhaal is listening to "Roadrunner" while splicing a porn scene she shot earlier that day.

Stephen King quoted a verse of the song to introduce one of the chapters of his novel Christine''. Every chapter of the novel begins with a quotation of lyrics from rock songs about cars.

Katrina and the Waves quote lyrics from "Roadrunner" in "Walking on Sunshine" with the repeated lines "I feel the love, I feel alive".

Influence
Journalist Laura Barton described "Roadrunner" as "one of the most magical songs in existence". In July 2007, Barton wrote an essay published in the newspaper about her attempt to visit all the places mentioned in Richman's recorded versions of the song, including the Stop & Shop at Natick, Massachusetts, the Howard Johnson's restaurant, the Prudential Tower, Quincy, Cohasset, Deer Island, Route 128,  and Interstate 90.

On February 13, 2013, then State Representative Marty Walsh introduced a bill to have "Roadrunner" named official rock song of Massachusetts. Richman however came out against this saying, "I don't think the song is good enough to be a Massachusetts song of any kind." Comedian and Massachusetts native John Hodgman came out in support of Walsh's bill, saying the song was, "woven as deeply into the cultural landscape of Massachusetts as the Turnpike itself. It is the pulsing sound of the night and the future. It connects the midnight ride of Paul Revere with the dream of every Massachusetts teenager who has just gotten their license and is discovering the Freedom Trail that is Route 128 after the last movie lets out." An Act designating the song “Roadrunner” as the official rock song of the Commonwealth of Massachusetts was proposed by David Paul Linsky and Denise Provost and ordered to a third reading on 2019-04-19.

References

Other sources

External links
[ Allmusic review of the song]

 Essay by Laura Barton in the Guardian newspaper - "The car, the radio, the night - and rock's most thrilling song"

1972 songs
1977 singles
Beserkley Records singles
The Modern Lovers songs
Song recordings produced by John Cale
Songs about cars
Songs about radio
Songs about Boston